Miss Midshipman (German: Fräulein Fähnrich) is a 1929 German silent film directed by Fred Sauer and starring Mary Parker, Willi Forst and Fritz Schulz.

The film's sets were designed by the art director August Rinaldi.

Cast
 Mary Parker as Nanette von Tankerfang
 Willi Forst as Oberleutnant Mellnitz
 Fritz Schulz as Fähnrich Peter Pfiff
 Leo Peukert as Kapitän Strupps
 Johannes Roth as Kasimir Nolpe
 Valeska Stock as Frau Kapitän Strupps
 Ida Wüst as Vorsteherin des Offizierstöchterheims
 Albert Paulig as Admiral von Tankerang
 Karl Platen as Hauswart
 Paul Morgan as Oberstabsarzt
 Fritz Kampers as Sanitätskorporal
 Emmy Wyda as Leiterin des 'Grauen Hauses'

References

Bibliography
 Bock, Hans-Michael & Bergfelder, Tim. The Concise CineGraph. Encyclopedia of German Cinema. Berghahn Books, 2009.

External links

1929 films
Films of the Weimar Republic
Films directed by Fred Sauer
German silent feature films
Seafaring films
Military humor in film
German black-and-white films
Silent adventure films